Anthony Andrew Cook (born May 30, 1972) is a former American football defensive end in the National Football League for the Washington Redskins and the Houston/Tennessee Oilers.  He played college football for Willie Jeffries at South Carolina State University and was drafted in the second round of the 1995 NFL Draft.

External links
NFL.com player page

American football defensive ends
American football defensive tackles
Houston Oilers players
South Carolina State Bulldogs football players
Tennessee Oilers players
Washington Redskins players
People from Bennettsville, South Carolina
1972 births
Living people